Allan Ray Guy (born May 18, 1926) is a former educator and political figure in Saskatchewan. He represented Athabasca from 1960 to 1975 in the Legislative Assembly of Saskatchewan as a Liberal. After leaving politics in 1975, Guy became principal at Prud'Homme Central School.

Personal life 
Guy was born and educated  in Senlac, Saskatchewan, the son of John Guy.  He worked on the family farm. Guy continued his studies at the Saskatoon Teacher's College and the University of Saskatchewan. He taught school for several years and then was school principal in La Ronge. Guy was married twice: first to Sylvia Evangeline Harach in 1951 and then to Marjorie Hastings in 1967.

Political career 
He served in the provincial cabinet as Minister of Public Works, as Minister of Municipal Affairs and as Minister of Indian and Métis Affairs. His election in 1971 was overturned after a judicial recount but he won the by-election that followed in 1972. Guy was an unsuccessful candidate for the Rosthern seat in the provincial assembly in 1975, losing to Ralph Katzman.

References 

Saskatchewan Liberal Party MLAs
1926 births
Living people